The de Havilland DH.15 Gazelle was an engine testbed for the B.H.P Atlantic engine, converted from a de Havilland DH.9A for flight trials in 1919–20. Only one was built.

Development
The DH.15 Gazelle, more often known just as the DH.15, was a standard DH.9A, complete with original armament, converted for use as an engine testbed. The engine involved was the 500 hp (373 kW) B.H.P. Atlantic, a water-cooled  V-12 unit produced by the Galloway Engineering Co., which merged two six-cylinder inline B.H.P. engines onto a common crankcase. This replaced the DH.9A's standard 400 hp (300 kW) Liberty 12, although without a great change in appearance, as the Atlantic was mounted behind a similar large rectangular radiator. Both engines were upright V-12s, both with crankshafts near the base, and in each case, the propeller was mounted low on the nose. The exhaust pipes on the DH.15 were longer than the usual DH.9A set, running straight back from the upper sides of the engine, ending at the observer's cockpit.

Two DH.15s were ordered, but only one was built. It completed many flights with the Atlantic engine from 1919 to 1920.

Specifications

References

Citations

Bibliography

1910s British experimental aircraft
DH.15
DH.015
Single-engined tractor aircraft
Biplanes
Aircraft first flown in 1919